34:13 is the second studio album by the electronic band The Body Lovers / The Body Haters. It was released in 1999 on Young God Records. The album was released under the name "The Body Haters".

Track listing

Personnel
Adapted from the 34:13 liner notes.
Musicians
 Kris Force – effects
 Michael Gira – musical arrangement, production
 Jarboe – effects
 James Plotkin – effects
Production and additional personnel
 Chris Griffin – editing, mastering

Release history

References 

1999 albums
Albums produced by Michael Gira
Young God Records albums